Brewcaria hohenbergioides is a plant species in the genus Brewcaria. This species is endemic to Venezuela.

References

hohenbergioides
Flora of Venezuela